The Aegean Islands are the group of islands in the Aegean Sea, with mainland Greece to the west and north and Turkey to the east; the island of Crete delimits the sea to the south, those of Rhodes, Karpathos and Kasos to the southeast. The ancient Greek name of the Aegean Sea, Archipelago (archipelagos) was later applied to the islands it contains and is now used more generally, to refer to any island group.

The vast majority of the Aegean Islands belong to Greece, being split among nine administrative regions. The only sizable possessions of Turkey in the Aegean Sea are Imbros (Gökçeada) and Tenedos (Bozcaada), in the northeastern part of the Sea. Various smaller islets off Turkey's western coast are also under Turkish sovereignty.

The islands have hot summers and mild winters, a hot-summer Mediterranean climate (Csa in the Köppen climate classification).

Groups of islands
The Aegean Islands are traditionally subdivided into seven groups, from north to south:

 Northeastern Aegean Islands
 Euboea
 Sporades (Northern Sporades)
 Cyclades
 Saronic Islands
 Dodecanese (Southern Sporades)
 Crete

The term Italian Islands of the Aegean is sometimes used to refer to the Aegean islands conquered by Italy during the Italo-Turkish War in 1912 and annexed (through the Treaty of Lausanne) from 1923 until 1947: the Dodecanese, including Rhodes and Kastellorizo. In the Treaty of Peace in 1947, these Italian-controlled islands were ceded to Greece.

Episcopal sees 
Ancient episcopal sees of the Roman province of Insulae (the Aegean Islands) listed in the Annuario Pontificio as titular sees :

Ancient episcopal sees of the Roman province of Lesbos (the Aegean Islands) listed in the Annuario Pontificio as titular sees:

See also
 List of Aegean Islands
 List of islands of Greece
 List of islands of Turkey#Aegean Sea islands

References

 Aegean Sea, The Columbia Encyclopedia, Sixth Edition. 2001–05.

External links 
 

 
Mediterranean islands
Traditional geographic divisions of Greece
Archipelagoes of Greece